Azlor is a municipality located in the province of Huesca, Aragon, Spain. As of 2018, the municipality has a population of 153 inhabitants.

References

Municipalities in the Province of Huesca